Computer Entertainment Supplier's Association (CESA) is a Japanese organization that was established in 1996 to "promote the computer entertainment industry [...] with the aim of contributing to the strengthening of Japanese industry as well as to the further enrichment of people's lifestyles." It organizes the annual Tokyo Game Show and Japan Game Awards.

CESA is located in Tokyo, Japan. Its current chairman of CESA is Hideki Okamura, the president of Sega Holdings. The Executive Managing Director is Hironori Hirogichi.

The Computer Entertainment Rating Organization (CERO), a rating agency, was established in 2002 as a branch of CESA.

See also
Supplier association

References

External links 
 Official English website

Video game trade associations
Trade associations based in Japan